Drona or Dronacharya is a person in the Mahābhārata.

Drona may also refer to:

 Drona (Simulator), small-arms range training simulator
 Drona (2008 film), a 2008 Indian Hindi film
 Drona (2009 film), a 2009 Indian Telugu film
 Drona (2020 film), a 2020 Indian Kannada film
 Drona 2010, a 2010 Indian film starring Mamooty
 Drona Parva, book of the Mahabharata
 Drona Prasad Acharya, Nepalese politician elected in 1991
 Drona (elephant), elephant named after Drona